Mohamed Zakariya,born 1942 in Ventura, California, is an American master Arabic calligrapher and an American Muslim convert.

Biography 
Mohamed Zakariya was born in 1942 in Ventura, California. Later he moved to Los Angeles with his family. Zakariya saw Islamic calligraphy for the first time in the window of an Armenian carpet store in Los Angeles. Zakariya traveled to Morocco in his late teens where he became fascinated with Islam and Islamic Calligraphy. After returning from his trip to the United States he converted to Islam.

Zakariya spent some time studying manuscripts in the British Museum. He then studied with the Egyptian calligrapher Abdussalam Ali-Nour. Afterwards in 1984, he traveled to Istanbul and became a student of the Turkish master calligrapher Hasan Celebi. He received his diploma from Celebi in 1988 at the Research Center of Islamic History, Art, and Culture in Istanbul. He is the first American to receive this honor. In 1997, he received his second diploma, in the ta'liq script, from the master calligrapher Ali Alparslan.

From 2004 to 2012, Zakariya was a member of the Joint Advisory Board, Virginia Commonwealth University School of the Arts in Qatar. He was awarded an Honorary Doctorate of Humane Letters by the university in 2012.

Students from around the world travel to the United States to study under Zakariya.

Calligraphy 
Zakariya's work is held in private collections and in some public collections. He designed a postage stamp for the United States Postal Service to commemorate Eid, which appeared in three editions in 2009, 2011 and 2013. In 2009, US president Barack Obama commissioned Mohamed Zakariya to create a piece of calligraphy that was presented to the king of Saudi Arabia.

References

General references
 "The Soul Searcher", Psychology Today, May/June 2004.
 "The World of Mohamed Zakariya", Saudi Aramco, January/February 1992.

External links 
Mohamed Zakariya's homepage
Sacred Space: The Mosque of the Two Pillars

1942 births
Living people
20th-century American artists
American calligraphers
American Muslims
Converts to Islam
Calligraphers of Arabic script
People from Ventura, California
20th-century calligraphers
21st-century calligraphers
21st-century American artists
Artists from California